Metropolitan Community can refer to:

 Metropolitan Community (Quebec)
 Communauté métropolitaine de Québec
 Montreal Metropolitan Community
 Metropolitan community of Brussels

See also 
 Metropolitan area
 Metropolitan Community Church
 Metropolitan Community College (disambiguation)